Chaos theory is a mathematical theory describing erratic behavior in certain nonlinear dynamical systems. 
	
Chaos Theory may also refer to:

Film and television
 Chaos Theory (film), a 2008 comedy-drama
 "Chaos Theory", an episode of ER (season 9)
 "Chaos Theory", an episode of CSI: Crime Scene Investigation (season 2)
 "Chaos Theory", an episode of The Unit (season 4)
 "Chaos Theory" (Agents of S.H.I.E.L.D.)

Other uses
 Chaos Theory (demo), a 2006 computer demo by Conspiracy
 "Chaos Theory", an episode of video game Life Is Strange
 Chaos Theory: Part 1, a 2012 EP by Like A Storm
 The Chaos Theory, a 2002 album by Jumpsteady
 Tom Clancy's Splinter Cell: Chaos Theory, a 2005 video game
 Chaos Theory – The Soundtrack to Tom Clancy's Splinter Cell: Chaos Theory, by Amon Tobin, 2005

See also